Robert Lee Romby (December 15, 1918 – November 25, 2004) was an American Negro league pitcher from 1946 to 1950.

A native of Shreveport, Louisiana, Romby served in the US Army during World War II. He made his Negro leagues debut in 1946 for the Baltimore Elite Giants, and played for Baltimore through 1950. In 1948, Romby was selected to represent the Elite Giants in the East–West All-Star Game, and in 1949 he was part of Baltimore's Negro American League championship club. Romby died in Farmville, Virginia in 2004 at age 85.

References

External links
 and Seamheads
 Bob Romby at Arkansas Baseball Encyclopedia

1918 births
2004 deaths
Baltimore Elite Giants players
20th-century African-American sportspeople
Baseball pitchers
21st-century African-American people